McCracken is a locality in the Australian state of  South Australia located about  south of the state capital of Adelaide in the local government area of the City of Victor Harbor.

Demographics
The 2006 census by the Australian Bureau of Statistics counted 1,549 persons in McCracken on census night. Of these, 47.3% were male and 52.7% were female.

The majority of residents (77%) are of Australian birth, with an additional 13.2% declaring England as their country of birth.

The average age of McCracken residents is higher than the greater Australian population. 79.1% of residents were over 25 years in 2006, compared to the Australian average of 66.5%; and 20.9% were younger than 25 years, compared to the Australian average of 33.5%.

Community
The local newspapers are the Independent Weekly and the Times.

Amenities
McCracken is notable as the location of the McCracken Country Club & Resort.

Cootamundra Reserve lies on the northeast boundary of the suburb.

Transportation

McCracken is serviced by Hindmarsh Road, linking the suburb to Victor Harbor. Victor Harbor Road forms the eastern boundary of McCracken.

References

External links
City of Victor Harbor
Local Government Association of SA – City of Victor Harbor

Towns in South Australia